KonoSuba: God's Blessing on This Wonderful World! is an anime television series adapted from the light novel series of the same title by Natsume Akatsuki. The series follows the adventures of Kazuma Satō who, after he dies of a heart attack after pushing a girl out of the way of a truck, which turned out to be a tractor, is sent to an RPG-like world, going on various adventures alongside a goddess named Aqua, a magician named Megumin, and a knight named Darkness.

Produced by Studio Deen, the series was directed by Takaomi Kanasaki and written by Makoto Uezu with character designs by Koichi Kikuta. Spanning two seasons, the series adapts the first four volumes of the light novels, and was followed by a 2019 film which adapted the fifth.

The first season (adapting volumes one and two of the novels) was broadcast on Tokyo MX in Japan from January 14 through March 16, 2016 and was simulcast by Crunchyroll and AnimeLab.

The opening theme is "Fantastic Dreamer" by Machico while the ending theme is  performed by Sora Amamiya, Rie Takahashi, and Ai Kayano.

A second season based on the third and fourth volumes of the series ran from January 11 to March 16, 2017. The second's season's opening theme is "Tomorrow" by Machico, and the ending theme is "Ouchi ni Kaeritai" by Amamiya, Takahashi, and Kayano.

An original video animation was bundled with the ninth light novel of KonoSuba in June 2016, and a second was released with the twelfth light novel in July 2017.

On May 28, 2022, the third season and adapted spin-off was announced to be released in 2023. Drive, an 2015-established animation studio would be producing the series onwards and replaced Studio Deen who produced the first two seasons of the series.

Series overview

Episode list

Season 1 (2016)

Original video animation

Season 2 (2017)

"God's Blessings on these wonderful works of art!" was released as episode 11 of season 2 on July 7, 2019.

Original video animation

Season 3 (2023)

Notes

References

KonoSuba
KonoSuba